The Portland International Auto Show (PIAS) is an annual auto show at the Oregon Convention Center in Portland in the U.S. state of Oregon. Started in 1910, the four-day event is held in January and draws approximately 100,000 visitors.

History
The show in 2010 was affected by a poor economy, with several manufacturers not participating. PIAS's 2011 show featured more than 1,200 cars from a total of 35 brands. In 2012, Chrysler debuted their Camp Jeep ride and drive program at the Portland show, and an exhibit entitled the ECO Center, featuring more environmentally friendly vehicles. Also that year, a Lamborghini Gallardo caught on fire when an employee attempted to burn off fuel by running it in neutral.  The 2012 show had an estimated 100,000 visitors over four-days.

See also
List of auto shows and motor shows by continent

References

External links

Tourist attractions in Portland, Oregon
Auto shows in the United States
1910 establishments in Oregon
Recurring events established in 1910
Festivals established in 1910